Chris Burnett is an American voice actor at Funimation. He has provided voices for a number of English-language versions of Japanese anime. He can be seen, alongside Marisha Ray as one of the hosts for GameStop TV. He is best known for playing Romeo in Romeo x Juliet and Koichi Aizawa in Nabari no Ou.

Filmography

Anime
 A Certain Scientific Railgun - Haruki Konoe (Ep. 17)
 A Certain Scientific Railgun S - Shunichi Kosako
 Assassination Classroom - Hiroto Maehara
 Baccano! - Shaft (Eps. 14-16)
 Baka and Test series - Ryo Sugawa
 Bamboo Blade - Yūji Nakata
 Big Windup! - Kosuke Izumi
 Birdy the Mighty Decode - Kazuyoshi Chigara, Hatsue Chigara
Black Clover - Lumiere Silvamillion Clover
 Blood-C - Itsuki Tomofusa
 Cat Planet Cuties - Gunner
 Corpse Princess - Takatoo (Ep. 9)
 D. Gray-man - Eric (Ep. 32)
 Darker than Black - Nick Hillman (Young, Ep. 12)
 Divine Gate - Aoto
 Dragonaut: The Resonance - Yuya Habaragi (Eps. 11-12)
 Dragon Ball Super - Referee (Eps. 32-41), Anat
 Fafner in the Azure: Heaven and Earth - Hiroto Dōma
 Fairy Tail - Yoku (aspiring novelist, Ep. 49), Deneb (Ep. 207)
 First Love Monster - Kota Shinohara
 Freezing - Arthur Clipton (credited as Patrick W. Reid)
 Ghost Hunt - Akifumi Yoshimi (Eps. 22-24)
 Good Luck Girl! - Naoya Hasegawa
 Haganai - Fujioka (Ep. 11)
 Hal - Hal
 Hell Girl - Yuji Numata (Ep. 15)
 Initial D series - Takeshi Nakazato (Funimation dub)
 Itsudatte My Santa! - Santa
 Kamisama Kiss series - Kotaro Urashima
 Kaze no Stigma - Tsang (Ep. 20)
 Kenichi: The Mightiest Disciple - Johnny, Mizunuma
 Kodacha - Sashuka
 Last Exile: Fam, the Silver Wing - Dinesh
 The Legend of the Legendary Heroes - Calne Kaiwal
 Nabari no Ou - Koichi Aizawa
 Ōkami-san and Her Seven Companions - Wakato Murano (Eps. 4, 12)
 One Piece - Portgas D. Ace (Young), Peppoko
 Peach Girl - Yori
 Prince of Stride: Alternative - Hajime Izumino
 Red Data Girl - Masumi Sōda
 Rideback - Dota Kawai
 Rin ~Daughters of Mnemosyne - Teruki Maeno (credited as Patrick W. Reid)
 The Rolling Girls - Johnny
 Romeo × Juliet - Romeo
 Save Me! Lollipop - Twelve (Ep. 12)
 Seraph of the End - Yoichi Saotome
 School Rumble: 2nd Semester - Jin Kobayashi (Ep. 23)
 Shakugan no Shana - Southvalley (Season 3)
 Shiki - Toru Muto
 Soul Eater - Dr. Franken Stein (Young), Masamune Nakatsukasa (Young)
 Strain: Strategic Armored Infantry - Colin (Ep. 1)
 Suzuka - Inoue
 Tokyo Ghoul - Koori Ui
 Tsubasa Tokyo Revelations - Nataku
 Unbreakable Machine-Doll - Loki
 Yamada-kun and the Seven Witches - Shinichi Tamaki
 Yona of the Dawn - Cheol-Ran

Live-action
 Comanche Moon - Augereau
 Friday Night Lights (TV series) - Adam Kendall
 Upper Hand - Sam Morello

Video Games
 Borderlands 3 - Killer Marauder

References

External links
Chris Burnett (Official Site)

IMDb 

Year of birth missing (living people)
Living people
American male voice actors